Virginia Downing (March 7, 1904 – November 21, 1996) was an American actress on Broadway and Off-Broadway.

Personal life and death
Downing was born on March 7, 1904, in Washington, D.C. She graduated from Bryn Mawr College and worked as a translator of plays for Garson Kanin. She was in the 1990 play Richard III which also starred Denzel Washington. Her husband was the actor John Leighton. Downing died on November 21, 1996, while on her way to a theater due to a heart attack.

Broadway plays
Father Malachy's Miracle
Forward the Heart
Cradle Will Rock
A Gift of Time
We Have Always Lived in the Castle
Arsenic and Old Lace

Off-Broadway plays
Juno and the Paycock
The Man with the Golden Arm
Palm Tree in a Rose Garden
Play with a Tiger
The Weives
The Idiot
Medea
Mrs. Warren's Profession
Mercy Street
Thunder Rock
Pygmalion
First Week in Bogota
Rimers of Eldritch
Les Blancs
Shadow of a Gunman
All The Way Home
Winter's Tale
Billy Liar
Shadow and Substance
Silent Catastrophe
Ernest in Love
Night Games
Frog In His Throat
All That Fall
Richard III'

References

1904 births
1996 deaths
American stage actresses
20th-century American actresses